Convoy TAG 18 was a trade convoy of merchant ships during the second World War. It was the 18th of the numbered TAG Convoys from Trinidad and Aruba to Guantánamo. The convoy was shadowed from 1 to 4 November by  skippered by Kapitänleutnant Georg Lassen (Knight's Cross with Oak Leaves) and joined on 5 November by  – skippered by Hans-Ludwig Witt (Knight's Cross of the Iron Cross). The two U-boats sank six ships from the convoy.

Ships in the convoy

References

Bibliography

External links
TAG 18 at convoyweb

TAG 18